New York has 2,192 MW of installed wind power capacity as of 2022. Most of New York's wind power is located in upstate New York as onshore wind farms. New York has set a goal of developing 9,000 MW of offshore installed wind power capacity by 2035 that will power an estimated 6 million homes. As of October 2022, New York has five offshore wind farms in development with approximately 4,300 MW installed capacity.

Wind farms 

The first wind farms in New York came online in 2000. They were relatively small projects. Madison Wind Farm, with a nameplate generating capacity of 11.55 MW, located in Madison County, was the first to commence operations. Also that year, the 6.6 MW Wethersfield Wind Farm, located in Wyoming County, came on line. The following year, the 30 MW Fenner Wind Farm, also in Madison County, commenced operations.

Five years passed before Maple Ridge Wind Farm, the largest wind farm in the state of New York, located in Lewis County, with 195 Vestas model V82 1.65 megawatt (MW) wind turbines, commenced operations. Collectively, the turbines have a rated or nameplate capacity of 320 MW. Maple Ridge Wind Farm became fully operational in January 2006.

The Bliss Windpark in Wyoming County opened in May 2008 with a capacity of 100.5 megawatts. Also, in 2008, the 100.5 MW Clinton Windpark, located in Clinton County, commenced operations. In February 2009, three other large wind farms — the Altona, Chateaugay, and Wethersfield Windparks — were completed in Upstate New York in Clinton, Franklin, and Wyoming Counties, respectively.  The projects have an installed capacity of 97.5, 106.5, and 124 MW respectively. All four use General Electric 1.5SLE wind turbines. The 112.5 MW Sheldon Wind Project in Wyoming County also came on line in 2009. In 2010, the Hardscrabble Wind Farm located in Herkimer County was constructed in the Towns of Farfield, Norway, and Little Falls, NY.  The wind farm has 37 Gamesa G90 2.0 MW wind turbines and came online in 2011. The project generates 74 Megawatts of power and is owned by Iberdrola Renewables. In 2012, the 215 MW Marble River Wind Farm, located in Clinton County, commenced operations.  Wind farms completed in 2018 include Arkwright Summit Wind Farm and Copenhagen Wind Farm.

The capacity factor of wind farms in New York is about 30 percent. However, the effective capacity — the fraction of rated power generated during summer afternoons, the period of peak demand — is estimated to be 10 percent for the whole state, except for Long Island where about 40% is forecast.

Wind power development
Wind is a very powerful element in society, and is able to provide energy without emitting greenhouse gases. Therefore, able to make a valid contribution to electricity demands. More than a quarter of power of the athletic complex at Union College of Schenectady County is supported by the endorsement of tall wind turbines. In 2014, energy projects accounted for more than 1,800 MW. Which in return estimated to be around 2.6 of the electric power available from "generation facilities in New York" and able to provide power for a million residents. While two power projects are being constructed in the state of New York, there is also a project under "active review." Wind energy development itself has striven towards achieving the goals of New York's renewable energy.

This series of projects is just a start for the 15th windiest state in the Nation, New York. The National Renewable Energy Laboratory has confirmed that the wind resource is able to provide at least half of the needs of the states electricity.

A NYISO study conducted in 2010, Growing Wind: Final Report of the NYISO 2010 Wind Generation Study (Sept. 2010), found that the New York power system will allow for the integration of up to 8,000 MW of wind generation with no adverse reliability impacts. At higher levels of wind generation, due to increased variability, the analysis determined that for every 1,000 MW increase between the 4,250 MW and 8,000 MW wind penetration level, the average regulation requirement increases approximately 9 percent. Further, given existing transmission constraints, at the 6,000 MW scenario modeled, 8.8% of the energy production in three areas of upstate New York (Zones C - Central, D - North, and E - Mohawk) would be "bottled" or undeliverable. With upgrades, the amount of bottled wind energy could be reduced to less than 2 percent. A similar bottling pattern was found in the 8,000 MW model. Offshore wind energy, as modeled, is fully deliverable.

In January 2015, Sims Municipal Recycling (a division of Sims Metal Management) inaugurated the New York City's only commercial-scale wind turbine at its recycling center at the South Brooklyn Marine Terminal.

Offshore wind power
In 2009, utilities in the state such as the New York Power Authority and Long Island Power Authority were exploring the possibility of large-scale offshore facilities, either in the ocean  or in the Great Lakes. The New York Power Authority cancelled, in 2011, the Great Lakes Offshore Wind (GLOW) project.

On September 8, 2011, the New York Power Authority, Long Island Power Authority, and Con Edison (the Offshore Wind Collaborative) filed a request with the US Department of the Interior, Bureau of Ocean Energy Management (BOEM) to issue a commercial lease on the outer continental shelf to the New York Power Authority for the development of the Long Island - New York City Offshore Wind Project. This project would be located in the Atlantic Ocean off Nassau County, approximately 13 nautical miles off Rockaway Peninsula, in a long 65,000-acre wedge-shaped area between shipping channels, directionally aligned southwest of Rockaway Peninsula. The project as now configured consists of 97 offshore turbines, with a total nameplate generating capacity of 350 MW. With 194 turbines, generating capacity could be doubled to 700 MW. Given the lengthy permitting process, the Collaborative's proposed project would not be operational until 2018 at the earliest. On January 4, 2013, BOEM issued a Request for Interest (Docket ID: BOEM-2012-0083) to determine whether other parties were interested in developing the same area. In addition to the Collaborative's response, BOEM received letters of interest in a commercial lease for this area from Fishermen's Energy LLC and Energy Management, Inc.

Another offshore wind energy project that would supply electricity to New York is Deepwater ONE. On September 12, 2013, BOEM awarded two commercial offshore wind energy leases, OCS-A-0486 and OCS-A-0487, to Deepwater Wind New England LLC for development of a regional offshore wind energy project. Deepwater ONE (formerly Deepwater Wind Energy Center) would be located in the Atlantic Ocean on 256 square miles on the outer continental shelf, approximately 30 miles east of Montauk, New York, and 15 miles east of Martha's Vineyard, Massachusetts. The project would consist of 150 to 200 turbines with a total nameplate generating capacity of 900 to 1,200 MW. It includes a 98-mile, 600 MW submarine transmission line, a new regional HVDC transmission system, and a New York-Long Island interconnector to link the electrical supply system in New England and Long Island.

Renewable energy incentives

Renewable Portfolio Standard
The New York State Public Service Commission adopted a Renewable Portfolio Standard (RPS) policy in 2004, calling for an increase in renewable energy used in the state from the then-current level of 19.3 percent (largely attributable to legacy hydroelectric power projects) to at least 25 percent by the end of 2013. In 2010, the Commission raised the standard to 30 percent by the end of 2015, and extended the program through 2015. With the RPS program due to sunset in 2015, the Commission has undertaken a program review. Unlike most states with an RPS, New York follows a central procurement model, with the New York State Energy Research and Development Authority (NYSERDA) responsible for meeting the majority of the RPS goals. NYSERDA obtains the bulk of the RPS Attributes (including any and all reductions in harmful pollutants and emissions such as carbon dioxide and oxides of sulfur and nitrogen) through a "Main Tier" competitive procurement of utility-scale renewable resources. A "Customer-Sited Tier," smaller, behind-the-meter resources provided by residential, commercial, institutional, and governmental projects, complements the Main Tier. Voluntary markets, state agency purchases, and Long Island Power Authority purchases make up the balance.

Wind power is the predominant generating technology in the Main Tier, with 21 wind farms generating or expected to generate 1,696 MW of new renewable energy by the end of 2014. As of the end of 2013, 18 wind farms funded through the Main Tier were generating 1,657 MW of new renewable energy.

Financial incentives
The New York State Energy Research and Development Authority (NYSERDA), through its  On-Site Wind Turbine Incentive Program (which began in 2007), is making $13.8 million available in incentives to encourage the installation of residential, commercial, institutional, and governmental end-use wind energy systems. The program runs from December 1, 2012 through December 31, 2015, with completed applications accepted through September 30, 2015. NYSERDA will pay up to 50 percent of the total installed cost of the wind energy system to eligible installers who install new approved, grid-connected systems using qualified equipment in accordance with eligibility requirements. The installer must pass the entire incentive through to the customer. The maximum incentive is $1 million per site or customer, and the maximum turbine size is 2 MW (2,000 kW).

Procedural reforms

With a strong tradition of home rule and, for many year, no state requirements or guidelines for locating facilities, the siting of large facilities in New York state has generated some controversy, along with myriad, diverse municipal efforts to zone or ban wind farms. Such conditions helped to produce in summer 2009 a Code of Conduct  promulgated by the state's Attorney General Andrew Cuomo and embraced by wind developers responsible for a majority of the state's facilities.

In a significant reform aimed at encouraging investment in clean energy technology, Governor Andrew Cuomo on August 4, 2011, signed into law the Power New York Act of 2011, Chapter 388 of the Laws of 2011, enacting Article 10 of the Public Service Law, establishing a unified siting review process for major electric generating facilities; that is, facilities with a generating capacity of 25 MW or more. The New York Department of Public Service and the New York Department of Environmental Conservation adopted implementing regulations on July 17, 2012:  Chapter X Certification of Major Electric Generating Facilities, 16 NYCRR Part 1000 and Analyzing Environmental Justice Issues in Siting of Major Electric Generating Facilities, 6 NYCRR Part 487. After July 17, 2012, all applicants for permits to construct major electric generating facilities must follow Article 10. In addition, applicants who had applied for permits or licenses before that date, along with applicants for permits or licenses for certain other types of electric generating facilities excluded from Article 10, may elect to follow Article 10.

Article 10 creates an administrative agency lodged within the Department of Public Service, the Board on Electric Generation Siting and the Environment, to conduct the reviews and make final administrative siting decisions. The Board has seven members; five are agency heads (the "Permanent Board") and two are appointed on a project-specific basis (the local, ad hoc public members). The new law provides a unified review process for the state permits, licenses, and other approvals required to site, construct, and operate a major electric generating facility. Department of Environmental Conservation review of permit applications under federally delegated or approved Clean Air Act, Clean Water Act, and Resource Conservation and Recovery Act programs is coordinated with, and conducted through, the Article 10 review. The Department of State's coastal zone consistency determination is also coordinated with the Article 10 review. Federal permitting and licensing reviews may be coordinated with the Article 10 review. Article 10 provides for consideration of local laws, and Board decisions must provide reasons for deviation from local substantive requirements. Article 10 seeks to promote early and effective public participation in the siting process, facilitating communication between the applicant and interested persons, to minimize later delays and reduce the likelihood of litigation challenging siting decisions. It provides numerous public participation opportunities, including the distribution of "intervenor funds" derived from application fees to enable municipalities and local parties to hire technical experts and lawyers to assist them in participating in the proceeding.

Further, an expansion of the state's net metering laws in 2008 may help to grow  the market for small-scale residential, agricultural, or commercial installations.

Installed capacity

Wind generation

 Teal background indicates the largest wind generation month for the year.

 Green background indicates the largest wind generation month to date.

Source:

See also

Solar power in New York
New York energy law
Wind power in the United States
Renewable energy in the United States

References

External links

The Wind Power Law Blog focuses on wind energy legal developments, especially regarding land use and zoning law, real estate transactions, environmental concerns, and judicial and regulatory actions. This blog emphasizes wind power developments in New York state, but also addresses issues of broader interest.
 Hope Farm Information on Wind Power - Page on securing incentives, building, and monitoring power generated by small-scale wind on Upstate NY farm.
List of New York State wind power projects

Wind power in New York (state)